Engorthoceratidae is a small family of Devonian orthocerids and a class of cephalopod found in eastern North America (Ohio and Indiana), containing only the genus Engorthoceras.

Taxonomy
Engorthoceratidae was named in 1962 by Rousseau Flower to contain the genus Engorthoceras, also named by Flower (1962), and assigned to the Michelinceratida.  The genotype is Orthoceras worthoni.

Morphology
Engorthoceras produced straight conical shells with a subcircular cross section and a small completely marginal siphuncle. The conical shell is suggestive of belemnite phragmocones and of its possible ancestry to Eobelemites.  Nothing is known of the animal itself.

References

Devonian cephalopods
Prehistoric nautiloid families
Monogeneric mollusc families
Devonian first appearances
Devonian extinctions
Taxa named by Rousseau H. Flower
Orthocerida